Lepidochrysops azureus is a butterfly in the family Lycaenidae. It was described by Arthur Gardiner Butler in 1879. It is endemic to Madagascar. The habitat consists of forests.

References

Butterflies described in 1879
Lepidochrysops
Endemic fauna of Madagascar
Butterflies of Africa
Taxa named by Arthur Gardiner Butler